The Wallu Sénégal Grand Coalition (WS) is a Senegalese opposition political coalition led by the 96-year-old ex-president of Senegal, Abdoulaye Wade, and his Senegalese Democratic Party. The party has entered into an alliance with the opposition Yewwi Askan Wi coalition to form a majority in the 2022 parliamentary election. As a result of the election the coalition obtained 24 seats becoming the third largest group in the National Assembly.

Composition
The coalition is composed of the following parties:

Electoral history

National Assembly elections

References

Political parties in Senegal
Elections in Senegal
Political party alliances in Senegal
Political parties established in 2021